Duryusan is a mountain in the county of Hwacheon, Gangwon-do in South Korea.

See also
List of mountains in Korea

Notes

References

Mountains of Gangwon Province, South Korea
Hwacheon County
Mountains of South Korea